César Herrera can refer to:

 César Herrera (basketball) (born 1937), Mexican Olympic basketball player
 César Herrera (rower) (born 1955), Cuban Olympic rower
 César Herrera (athlete), Colombian race walker in the 2015 Pan American Race Walking Cup
 Cesar Herrera (baseball), American baseball player selected in the 2004 Rule 5 draft
 César Herrera (karateka), Venezuelan Olympic karateka in the 2015 Pan American Games
 César Herrera (runner), Paraguayan athlete in the 2004 South American Cross Country Championships